Three is a 1969 British drama film written and directed by James Salter. The film stars Charlotte Rampling, Robie Porter, Sam Waterston, Pascale Roberts, Edina Ronay and Gillian Hills. The film was released on 23 December 1969, by United Artists.

Synopsis
Two American college friends are on a trip in Europe near the Mediterranean. Although they meet a lot of women, a particular English tourist catches their attention, so they decided to become friends with her.

Cast
Charlotte Rampling as Marty 
Robie Porter as Bert
Sam Waterston as Taylor
Pascale Roberts as Claude
Edina Ronay as Liz
Gillian Hills as Ann
Alfredo Rizzo as Waiter
Paul Cooper as Photographer
Patrizia Giammei as Gloria
Mario Cotone as Silvano
Franca Tasso as Hélène
Roberto Scheiber as Piero

References

External links
 

1969 films
British drama films
1969 drama films
United Artists films
Films scored by Laurence Rosenthal
1960s English-language films
1960s British films